Clarence Coleman may refer to:

 Clarence Coleman (gridiron football) (born 1980), American gridiron football wide receiver
 Clarence Coleman (baseball) (1884–?), African-American baseball catcher in the pre-Negro leagues
 Choo-Choo Coleman (1937–2016), American professional baseball catcher